Stefano Rabolli Pansera (born 9 August 1980) is an Italian architect, architectural theorist, urbanist and curator. Rabolli Pansera studied at the Architectural Association School of Architecture in London where he graduated with Honours in 2005 and where he taught as Unit Master of Intermediate Unit 5 from 2007 to 2011.

Rabolli Pansera is the founding director of Beyond Entropy Ltd.
In 2013, Stefano Rabolli Pansera co-curated the Angola Pavilion with Paula Nascimento at the 55th International Art Exhibition - La Biennale di Venezia. The Angola Pavilion won the Golden Lion for "best national participation".

References

1980 births
Living people
21st-century Italian architects
Italian art curators